In organic chemistry the Hoch-Campbell ethylenimine synthesis is a method for constructing ethyleneimines from oximes.  The oxime is treated with Grignard reagents:

References

Aziridines
Oximes